Hannah Ama Nyarko (born 25 July 1964) has been Ghana's Ambassador to Israel since January 2018.  Nyarko is Ghana's first female Ambassador to the State of Israel.

Education
Nyarko holds Bachelor of Science degree in Administration and a master of Arts degree in International Affairs from University of Ghana.

References

1964 births
Living people
University of Ghana alumni
Ghanaian women ambassadors
Ambassadors of Ghana to Israel